Honor Blackman (22 August 1925 – 5 April 2020) was an English actress, known for the roles of Cathy Gale in The Avengers (1962–1964), Bond girl Pussy Galore in Goldfinger (1964), Julia Daggett in Shalako (1968), and Hera in Jason and the Argonauts (1963). She is also known for her role as Laura West in the ITV sitcom The Upper Hand (1990–1996).

Early life
Honor Blackman was born on 22 August 1925 in Plaistow, the daughter of Edith Eliza (Stokes) and Frederick Blackman, a civil service statistician. She attended North Ealing Primary School and Ealing County Grammar School for Girls. For her 15th birthday, her parents gave her acting lessons and began her training at the Guildhall School of Music and Drama in 1940. While attending the Guildhall School, Blackman worked as a clerical assistant for the Home Office. Following graduation, she was an understudy in the West End play The Guinea Pig. In 1947 she appeared in the Patrick Hastings play The Blind Goddess at the Apollo Theatre.

Career

Films
Blackman's film debut was a nonspeaking part in Fame Is the Spur (1947). Her other films include Quartet (1948), based on short stories by W. Somerset Maugham, starring Dirk Bogarde; Diamond City (1949), So Long at the Fair (1950), in which she again appeared with Dirk Bogarde; Green Grow the Rushes (1951), alongside Roger Livesey and Richard Burton; A Night to Remember (1958), an account of the Titanic disaster; the comedy The Square Peg (1958); Life at the Top (1965) with Laurence Harvey; The Virgin and the Gypsy (1970), and the Western films Shalako (1968) with Sean Connery and Brigitte Bardot, and Something Big (1971) with Dean Martin.

She played Hera in Jason and the Argonauts (1963), which featured stop-motion animation by Ray Harryhausen. She had roles in the films Bridget Jones's Diary (2001) and Jack Brown and the Curse of the Crown (also 2001).

James Bond
During the 1960s, Blackman practised judo at the Budokwai dojo. This helped her prepare for her roles as Cathy Gale in The Avengers and Pussy Galore in Goldfinger (1964).

Albert R. Broccoli said Blackman was cast opposite Sean Connery in the Bond film on the basis of her success in the British television series The Avengers. He knew that most American audiences would not have seen the programme. Broccoli said, "The Brits would love her because they knew her as Mrs. Gale, the Yanks would like her because she was so good, it was a perfect combination."

Theatre
In 1968, Blackman appeared opposite John Neville and Hylda Baker in the musical play Mr & Mrs, based on the plays of Noël Coward. In the late 1970s, she toured Australia and New Zealand with Michael Craig and Colleen Clifford in the comedy play Move Over, Mrs Markham. In February 1979, she starred in Stephen Barry's production of Tom Stoppard's Night and Day at the Perth Playhouse, coinciding with Stoppard's presence as a participant in the Festival of Perth.

In 1981, she appeared in a London revival of The Sound of Music opposite Petula Clark. The production opened to rave reviews and the largest advance sale in British theatre history to that time. She spent most of 1987 at the Fortune Theatre starring as the Mother Superior in the West End production of Nunsense.

Blackman returned to the theatre in 2005, touring through 2006 with a production of My Fair Lady, in which she played Mrs. Higgins. She developed a one-woman show, Word of Honor, which premiered in October 2006. From April to September 2007, Blackman took over the role of Fraulein Schneider in Cabaret at the Lyric Theatre in London's West End.

Television

Blackman started acting on television in the recurring role of Nicole, secretary/assistant to Dan Dailey's character of Tim Collier in the television series The Four Just Men (1959). In an episode of The Saint titled "The Arrow of God" (1962), Blackman played an adulterous personal secretary named Pauline Stone, who became one of several suspects in the murder of a despised gossip columnist.

In The Avengers from 1962 to 1964, she played Dr Cathy Gale, a self-assured, quick-witted anthropologist who was skilled in judo and had a passion for leather clothes. Gale was unlike any female character seen before on British TV.  Blackman left the series after its third season to co-star in the James Bond film Goldfinger. 

In an episode of The Avengers, "Too Many Christmas Trees" (1965), John Steed received a Christmas card from Cathy Gale. Reading the envelope, he says in a puzzled voice, "Whatever can she be doing at Fort Knox ...?" It was an inside joke, as Blackman was filming Goldfinger at the time.

In December 1969 and February 1993, Blackman was taken by surprise as the subject of This Is Your Life. In 1972, Blackman (as a special guest star) and Richard Basehart played a married pair of Shakespearean actors who commit murder in the American crime mystery series Columbo (episode "Dagger of the Mind"). In 1983, she appeared in a film production of Agatha Christies novel, The Secret Adversary, in the role of Rita Vandemeyer, and as Juno/Empress Eugénie in the BBC television production of Orpheus in the Underworld.

In 1986, she had a role in "Terror of the Vervoids", a segment of the Doctor Who serial The Trial of a Time Lord. From 1990 to 1996, she appeared as Laura West on The Upper Hand. In 2003, Blackman took a guest role on Midsomer Murders, as ex-racing driver Isobel Hewitt in the episode "A Talent for Life". In September 2004, she briefly joined the Coronation Street cast in a storyline about wife swapping. In 2007, she participated in the BBC TV project The Verdict. She was one of 12 well-known figures who made up a jury to hear a fictional rape case. The series was designed to explore the jury system. She was sworn in as a juror as "Honor Kaufmann". In 2013, she guest-starred in the BBC medical drama Casualty and in By Any Means.

Blackman also appeared in a number of episodes of Never the Twain with Donald Sinden and Windsor Davies as veterinarian Veronica Barton.

Singing career
Blackman's recording with The Avengers co-star Patrick Macnee of "Kinky Boots" (1964), referring to the boots she wore in the show, failed to chart upon its original release, but became a surprise hit in 1990. The song peaked at number five after being played incessantly by BBC Radio 1 breakfast-show presenter Simon Mayo. After her appearance in Goldfinger, Blackman recorded a full album of songs titled Everything I've Got.

In 1968, Blackman released a 45 rpm record of "Before Today"/"I'll Always Be Loving You" (CBS 3896), which were featured in the musical play Mr & Mrs. In 1983 she sang as Juno in a special TV production of Jacques Offenbach's Orpheus in the Underworld.

On 6 July 2009, Blackman released a new single, "The Star Who Fell from Grace", composed by Jeff Chegwin and Adrian Munsey. She also compered the James Bond Prom, part of the "Welsh Proms" concert series in 2009.

Other roles
Blackman appeared in the Doctor Who audio drama The Children of Seth, as Anahita, released in December 2011.

Personal life
Blackman was married to Bill Sankey from 1948 to 1956. After their divorce, she married British actor Maurice Kaufmann (1961–75). They appeared together in the slasher film Fright (1971) and some stage productions. They adopted two children, Lottie (1967) and Barnaby (1968).

After her divorce from Kaufmann, she did not remarry and stated that she preferred being single. She enjoyed watching football.

Blackman owned a summer house in Islesboro, Maine, United States.

Blackman died at her home in Lewes, East Sussex, on 5 April 2020, aged 94, from natural causes.

Politics
Blackman was a British Republican, a member of the Liberal Democrats and was previously a member of the Liberal Party, campaigning for the party during the 1964 general election. She declined a CBE in 2002, as she felt that as a republican it would be hypocritical to accept the award. She publicly supported changing the British electoral system from first-past-the-post to alternative vote for electing members to the House of Commons in the Alternative Vote referendum in 2011.

In 2012, Blackman publicly criticised actor Sean Connery, her Bond co-star in the 1960s, for his status as a tax exile. She said, "I disapprove of him strongly now. Because I don't think you should accept a title from a country and then pay absolutely no tax towards it. He wants it both ways. I don't think his principles are very high."

Following the death of Margaret Thatcher in April 2013, when asked about her thoughts on Thatcher, Blackman responded:

Filmography

Film

Television
 African Patrol (1958-1959, TV Series) as Pat Murray / Grace Bowler / Isobel Thorne
 The Saint (1962, TV Series) as Pauline Stone
 The Avengers (1962–1964, TV Series) as Cathy Gale
 Boney: Boney In Venom House (1972, TV Series) as Mary Answorth
 Columbo: Dagger of the Mind (1972, TV Series) as Lillian Stanhope
 Orpheus in the Underworld (BBC TV, 1983) as Juno / Empress Eugénie
 The First Olympics: Athens 1896 (1984, TV Mini-Series) as Ursula Schumann
 Minder on the Orient Express (1985, TV Series) as Helen Speeder
 Doctor Who (1986, Episode: "Terror of the Vervoids") as Professor Lasky
 The Upper Hand (1990–1996, TV Series) as Laura West
 Midsomer Murders (2003, TV Series) as Isobel Hewitt
 Summer Solstice (2005, TV Movie) as Countess Lucinda Reeves
 New Tricks (2005, TV Series) as Kitty Campbell
 Hotel Babylon (2009, TV Series) as Constance Evergreen
 Casualty (2013, TV Series) as Agatha Kirkpatrick
 By Any Means (2013, TV Series) as Celia Butler
 You, Me & Them (2015, TV Series) as Rose Walker
 Silent Witness as uncredited resident of old people's home (final appearance)

References

External links

 
 
 Honor Blackman profile, bris.ac.uk; accessed 22 August 2015.

1925 births
2020 deaths
Alumni of the Guildhall School of Music and Drama
English republicans
English women singers
English film actresses
English musical theatre actresses
English soap opera actresses
English stage actresses
English television actresses
Actresses from London
People educated at Ealing County Grammar School for Girls
People from Plaistow, Newham
20th-century English actresses
21st-century English actresses
People from Islesboro, Maine
British republicans
Liberal Democrats (UK) people
British female judoka